Michael John Lee (born 24 March 1957) is an Australian Labor politician.  He was a member of the House of Representatives 1984–2001, a minister in Paul Keating's government, and a member of the City of Sydney Council 2004–08.

Early life and education 
Lee was born in Sydney, Australia where he grew up in the beachside suburb of Cronulla. Here, he attended De La Salle College, Cronulla. His immediate classmates included Steve Hutchins, a former Australian Senator, and John Della Bosca, formerly the NSW Minister for Health.

After graduating in electrical engineering from the University of New South Wales, Lee was employed as an engineer at the Munmorah Power Station and Vales Point Power Station on the Central Coast of New South Wales.

Political career 
He was subsequently elected as a Labor member of the Australian House of Representatives for the seat of Dobell, at the 1984 election, serving until being defeated at the 2001 election by Liberal candidate Ken Ticehurst.

In March 1993, Lee was appointed Minister for Tourism and Minister for Resources in the second Keating Ministry. In December 1993, he replaced Bob Collins and David Beddall as Minister for Communications. In January 1994, he gained responsibility for the arts.  

As Arts Minister, his first shadow was Opposition Leader John Hewson who had also been the Shadow Arts Minister.
He lost his ministerial responsibility with the defeat of the Keating government at the 1996 election. He was Shadow Minister for Health from 1996 to 1998 and shadow Minister for Education from 1998 to 2001. Following his defeat in 2001, he ran as the Labor candidate for Lord Mayor of Sydney in 2004, and was defeated by Clover Moore, but was elected to the Council.

Lee became President of the New South Wales branch of the Australian Labor Party in 2010, following the resignation of Bernie Riordan.

References

 

1957 births
Living people
Australian Labor Party members of the Parliament of Australia
Members of the Australian House of Representatives for Dobell
Members of the Australian House of Representatives
Members of the Cabinet of Australia
Central Coast (New South Wales)
University of New South Wales alumni
Politicians from Sydney
People from the Sutherland Shire
21st-century Australian politicians
20th-century Australian politicians
People educated at De La Salle College, Cronulla